"Plant" is a song recorded by South Korean singer Sejeong released on March 17, 2020, by Jellyfish Entertainment. It was initially distributed by Stone Music Entertainment but the music video has since been taken down and is now distributed by Kakao M. The track serves as the title track for her debut solo album of the same name, Plant.

Background
On March 5, 2020, Sejeong released teaser photos regarding her comeback. Two music video teasers were unveiled before its release.

Composition and lyrics
"Plant" is a sentimental ballad track which is composed by Sunwoo Jung-a and co-written with Ahn Shin-ae. The ballad expresses the feelings of consolation one receives from a small plant in a flowerpot. The lyrics describe the metaphor of caring for a plant, as caring for a loved one.

Commercial performance
The single took top spot on the chart of music streaming site Bugs, second on Genie's chart and fourth on Soribada's chart a day after the release. It also peaked at number 82 on the Gaon Digital Chart.

Music video
The music video begins in a dark but cozy room where she is seen relaxing,  taking care of a plant seedling inside a plastic bag. She then exits her room into the outdoors, which is filled with garbage and pollution such as empty plastic bags. She eventually lands back into her room and smiles, seeing her plant she cared for be out of the bag, and sprouting a flower.

Promotion
Sejeong promoted the single and her album on music programs. The single got its first win on March 24, 2020, at SBS MTV's The Show.

Accolades

Credits and personnel
Credits adapted from Melon.

Sejeongvocals
Sunwoo Jung-alyricist, composer, arranger
Ahn Shin-aelyricist
Cho Song-taearranger

Charts

Release history

References

Kim Se-jeong songs
2020 songs
Korean-language songs
2020 singles
Jellyfish Entertainment singles